Craig Coleman (June 28, 1961 – December 3, 1994) was an American artist.

Biography

Early life 
Coleman was born in San Jose, California. He graduated from Willow Glen High School in 1979 before moving to San Francisco in 1980 and New York City in 1981.

Career 
Coleman was a contemporary of Jean-Michel Basquiat, Paul Benney, Keith Haring, Rick Prol, Kjell Erik Killi Olsen, Kenny Scharf and Robert Mapplethorpe. He was a prominent figure in the Downtown Art Scene in the 80s, producing a prodigious body of work both in sculpture and painting, often using found materials. His first show was with 'The New Math Gallery', one of the pioneering galleries in the East Village. He shared studio space on 12th Street with the British artist Paul Benney.

Steven Rudy, a professor at New York University described Coleman's work as 'intensely spiritual'. Paul Bridgewater of The Bridgewater Gallery, one of Coleman's early champions called him 'Urban Primitive'. His first serious venture into performance was the show 'The year 8000', a multimedia event, at the 'La Mama Theater', NYC. With Steve Stevens, in 1988, he produced hundreds of paintings to illustrate slides for the show.

His artistic style changed with his move to Miami in 1989, reflecting the sunny, hedonistic, party atmosphere in South Beach. Coleman became involved with Drag Performance in Miami, with his alter ego 'Varla', while still producing serious art. 'Varla' inspired 'Varla TV', a cable TV show. His shows gained a cult following in South Beach, with Varla holding court at his Espanola Way studio. At this time, Coleman began contributing to a South Beach gossip column for 'Wire Magazine'. He used his talents to raise money for AIDS charities

One of Coleman's works is in the Museum of Contemporary Art, North Miami. A large body of his work was lost after his death, but much work survived due to his prolific output.

Death 
Coleman died December 3, 1994 in Miami.

Solo exhibitions

Group exhibitions

Further reading 

 East Village Collection, Ivey-Selkirk, 02/2013 by MutualArt
 The Artists Who Defined the East Village's Avant-Garde Scene by NY Times
 "Irascibles" Inspiration by Suzanne Lovell
 Arts Magazine - East Village ancient history by Philip Pocock on Scribd
 Those We Lost to the AIDS Epidemic by NY Times
 Well Hung by Miami New Times

References 

1961 births
1994 deaths
AIDS-related deaths in Florida